Foreign Languages Press is a publishing house located in China.

Based in Beijing, it was founded in 1952 and currently forms part of the China International Publishing Group, which is owned and controlled by the Publicity Department of the Chinese Communist Party.

The press publishes books on a wide range of topics in eighteen languages spoken primarily outside China. Much of its output is aimed at the international community – its 1960s editions of works by Marx and Lenin are still widely circulated – but it also publishes some material aimed at foreign language students within China.

Beginning in the 1950s many works of classical and modern Chinese literature were translated into English by translators such as Gladys Yang, Yang Xianyi and Sidney Shapiro.

As of 2008, the house had published over 30,000 titles in a total of 43 languages.

Book series

English language titles
 Ancient Towns Around Shanghai
 China Handbook Series
 China Knowledge Series
 China Society for People's Friendship Studies
 China Sports Series
 China Travel Kit Series
 China's Nationalities Series
 Chinese Health Qigong Series
 Chinese Language Library
 Chinese Wushu Series
 The Culture & Civilization of China
 Echos from the Classics
 History of Modern China Series
 How To Series
 Library of Chinese Classics
 Light on China Series
 Modern Chinese Literature Library
 Monkey Series
 Panda Series
 Picture Story Series
 Studies on the Chinese Market Economy Series
 Ten Minutes Series
 Traditional Chinese Therapeutic Exercises and Techniques

French language titles
 Contes populaires chinois
 Connaissance de la Chine
 Histoire moderne de Chine
 Le roi des singes

See also
Foreign Languages Publishing House (Soviet Union), Moscow – similar publisher in Soviet Union
Foreign Languages Publishing House (North Korea), Pyongyang – similar publisher in North Korea
 Foreign Languages Publishing House (Vietnam), Hanoi – similar publisher in Vietnam which is now known as Thế Giới Publishers

References

External links
 
 Archival links of Foreign Languages Press at The Internet Archive in the US
 Foreign Languages Press – company description, history and contact details
Foreign Languages Press Celebrates 50th Anniversary, at China Internet Information Center
Foreign Languages Press, Embassy of the People's Republic of China in India

Political book publishing companies
Publishing companies of China
Organizations associated with the Chinese Communist Party
Chinese propaganda organisations
Publishing companies established in 1952